Awrboogays(Awrbogays, Awr-boogays, Ar-boogays) is a town in south-central Sanaag in Somaliland.

History
Awrboogays is a town created in 1995 after the Somali civil war.

In 2004, Malnutrition levels in the Sool Plateau improved significantly but not in Hingalol and Awrboogays.

In January 2013, parallel events were held in Taleh, Buuhoodle, Bo'ame, Awrboogays, and other locations to commemorate the first anniversary of the establishment of the Khatumo State.

In September 2013, the mayor of Hudun district requested the Somaliland government to utilize the underground resources in Awrboogays and other areas in Hudun district.

In October 2013, Somaliland President Ahmed Mohamed Mohamoud visited Awrboogays and announced the elevation of Awrboogays to district (degmo) status.

In January 2015, Somaliland Insurance Minister Suleiman Haglotosiye announced in a speech in Las Anod that he had created an organization to deliver medical equipment and medicines to Kalabaydh, Hudun and Awrboogays.

In July 2016, a peace conference was hosted by the Minister of Somaliland in Awrboogays, where the Maxamud Bari Hiniinle and C/raxmaan Harti branches of the Dulbahante clan spoke.

In September 2020, the Ministry of Health of Puntland instructed to deliver refrigerators and other items to maternity hospitals in Taleh, hudun, Awrboogays and Bo'ame.

In September 2021, fighting broke out between Hudun and Awrboogays, killing a Somaliland military commander in Hudun district.

Maternity hospital
Awrboogays has the first hospital built in the vicinity, and patients come from Dararweyne, El Afweyn, Sarmaanyo, Godaalo, Fiqifuliye, Damala Hagare, Hudun etc. are also patients.

In April 2018, the Somali community in Columbus, Ohio, met to raise funds to build a hospital for mothers and babies in Widhwidh and Awrboogays in the Sanaag and Cayn areas.

In August 2019, a maternity hospital was built in Awrboogays. Until then there was only a hospital in Las Anod.

In June 2020, the first lady of the Federal Republic of Somalia provided medical equipment and medicines to the maternity hospitals in Widhwith and Awrboogays.

Demographics
The city of Awrboogays is primarily settled by the Dhulbahante, with the Naleye Ahmed subsection of the Mohamoud Garaad well represented.

References

Populated places in Sanaag